Vladimir Grozdanović (born 17 October 1937) is a Yugoslav former sports shooter. He competed at the 1960 Summer Olympics and the 1968 Summer Olympics.

References

1937 births
Living people
Yugoslav male sport shooters
Olympic shooters of Yugoslavia
Shooters at the 1960 Summer Olympics
Shooters at the 1968 Summer Olympics
Sportspeople from Niš